Aapdi Thaapdi is a Indian Marathi-language drama film written and directed by Anand Karir. It stars Shreyas Talpade, Mukta Barve, Sandeep Pathak and Navin Prabhakar and was released theatrically on 5 October 2022.

Plot
The story is about friendship between a girl and a goat, revolving around Sakharam Patil (Shreyas Talpade), a very miserly but intelligent farmer living in a village, his wife Parvati (Mukta Barve), daughter Tulshi (Khushi Hazare) and his friend Sandeep Pathak (Damu) who lives in the house.

Cast 
Shreyas Talpade as Sakharam Patil
Mukta Barve as Parvati Patil
Khushi Hajare as Tulshi aka Mau
Sandeep Pathak as Damu
Navin Prabhakar as Yuvraj Bhosale
Nandu Madhav
Aman Gupta
Anup Kendre

Production
The film was announced and principal photography of the film started in January 2022.

Marketing and release 
Official teaser of the film launched on 11 September 2022, on YouTube, and the trailer of the film launched 26 September 2022.

Soundtrack

Reception

Critical response 

Aapdi Thaapdi received positive reviews from critics. Anub George of The Times of India gave the film three and a half stars out of five and was appreciative of all major aspects of production, opining that it "'Aapdi Thaapdi' feels like a warm hug. It is a simple story of simple people that ends up teaching the audience several small lessons". Jaideep Phatak of Maharashtra Times also gave it three stars out of five and similarly found that "if you look at it through a different lens, savor it, it gives you the satisfaction of seeing something different." Reshma Raikwar of Loksatta felt the film was "A small story, a small incident explains a big story in life. Similarly, the film 'Apadi Thapdi' directed by Anand Karir should be mentioned as a film that gives a somewhat pure experience."

References

External links 
 

2022 films
2020s Marathi-language films